Ischalis nelsonaria, also known as the angled fern looper, is a species of moth of the family Geometridae. It was first described in 1875. This species is endemic to New Zealand,

The larval host of this species Zealandia pustulata. When mature the larva is approximate 35 mm in length and is coloured brown. The adult moth is on the wing from February to March. It has been observed feeding on the flowers of Metrosideros diffusa.

References

Ennominae
Moths of New Zealand
Moths described in 1875
Endemic fauna of New Zealand
Endemic moths of New Zealand